Desulfurization or desulphurisation is a chemical process for the removal of sulfur from a material. This involves either the removal of sulfur from a molecule (e.g. A=S → A:) or the removal of sulfur compounds from a mixture such as oil refinery streams.

These processes are of great industrial and environmental importance as they provide the bulk of sulfur used in industry (Claus process and Contact process), sulfur-free compounds that could otherwise not be used in a great number of catalytic processes, and also reduce the release of harmful sulfur compounds into the environment, particularly sulfur dioxide (SO2) which leads to acid rain.

Processes used for desulfurization include hydrodesulfurization, SNOX process and the wet sulfuric acid process (WSA process).

See also
 Shell–Paques process
 Flue-gas desulfurization
 Biodesulfurization

References

Chemical processes
Sulfur